Americana artifacts are related to the history, geography, folklore, and cultural heritage of the United States of America. Americana is any collection of materials and things concerning or characteristic of the United States or of the American people, and is representative or even stereotypical of American culture as a whole.

What is and is not considered Americana is heavily influenced by national identity, historical context, patriotism and nostalgia. The ethos or guiding beliefs or ideals which have come to characterize America, such as The American Dream, are central to the idea. Americana encompasses not only material objects but also people, places, concepts and historical eras which are popularly identified with American culture.

The name Americana also refers to Americana music, a genre of contemporary music that incorporates elements of various American music styles, including country, roots rock, folk, bluegrass, and blues, resulting in a distinctive roots-oriented sound.

As nostalgia
From the mid to late 20th century, Americana was largely conceptualized as a nostalgia for an idealized life in small towns and cities in the United States around the turn of the century, roughly in the period between 1880 and the First World War, popularly considered "The Good Old Days". It was believed that much of the structure of 20th-century American life and culture had been cemented in that time and place. American author Henry Seidel Canby wrote:

Many kinds of cultural artifacts fall within the definition of Americana: the things involved need not be old, but are usually associated with some quintessential element of the American experience. Each period of United States history is reflected by the advertising and marketing of the time, and the various types of antiques, collectibles, memorabilia and vintage items from these time periods are typical of what is popularly considered Americana. The Atlantic described the term as "slang for the comforting, middle-class ephemera at your average antique store—things like needle-pointed pillows, Civil War daguerreotypes, and engraved silverware sets".

The nostalgia for this period was based on a remembrance of confidence in American life that had emerged during the period due to such factors as a sense that the frontier had finally been "conquered", with the U.S. Census Bureau's declaration that it was "closed" in 1890, as well as the recent victory in the Spanish–American War. By 1912, the contiguous United States was at last fully politically incorporated, and the idea of the nation as a single, solid unity could begin to take hold.

As Canby put it,

On growing up Italian-American, novelist Don DeLillo stated:

The zeitgeist of this idealized period is captured in the Disneyland theme park's Main Street, U.S.A. section (which was inspired by both Walt Disney's hometown of Marceline, Missouri and Harper Goff's childhood home of Fort Collins, Colorado), as well as the musical and movie The Music Man and Thornton Wilder's stage play Our Town. Especially revered in nostalgic Americana are small-town institutions like the barber shop, drug store, soda fountain and ice cream parlor; some of these were eventually resurrected by mid-twentieth century nostalgia for the time period in businesses like the Farrell's Ice Cream Parlour chain, with its 1890s theme.

Examples

Cultural symbols

 American football
 Baseball
 Blue jeans
 Camp meeting
 Cowboy 
 Flag of the United States
 Fourth of July
 Mount Rushmore
Route 66
 Small town
 Statue of Liberty
 Tent revival
 Thanksgiving
 White picket fence
Wild West

Food
Apple pie
Barbecue
Bubble gum
Buffalo wing
Hamburger
Hot dog
Fried chicken
Milkshake
Pizza

Music
Blues
Country
Jazz
Rock and roll
 "The Star-Spangled Banner"

Brand names

 Budweiser
 Chevrolet
 Coca-Cola
 Ford
 Harley-Davidson
 Jack Daniel's
 Jim Beam
 Levi's blue jeans, especially Levi's 501s
 Marlboro
 Nike

See also
 History of immigration to the United States
 Culture of the United States
 Folklore of the United States
 History of the United States
 American studies
 Transcendentalism
 Romanticism
 Black Americana

Similar concepts

 Australiana, for cultural artifacts from Australia
 Canadiana, for cultural artifacts from Canada
 Communist nostalgia, a similar concept in former or currently communist countries
 Floridiana, artifacts relating to the state of Florida.
 Hawaiiana, Native Hawaiian cultural artifacts from the U.S. state of Hawaii.
 Kiwiana, for cultural artifacts from New Zealand
 Ostalgie, a similar concept in East Germany
 PRL nostalgia, a similar concept in Poland
 Rhodesiana, a similar concept in Zimbabwe relating to items made in its colonial (Rhodesia) era
 Soviet nostalgia, a similar concept in the former Soviet Union
 Yugo-nostalgia, a similar concept in the former Yugoslav states

References

External links

Merriam-Webster definition of "Americana"

 
Nostalgia in the United States